The women's 500 metres in speed skating at the 1984 Winter Olympics took place on 10 February, at the Zetra Ice Rink.

Records
Prior to this competition, the existing world and Olympic records were as follows:

The following new Olympic record was set.

Results

References

Women's speed skating at the 1984 Winter Olympics
Olymp
Skat